The 15th Canadian Parliament was in session from 7 January 1926, until 2 July 1926. The membership was set by the 1925 federal election on 29 October 1925, and it changed only somewhat due to resignations and by-elections until it was dissolved prior to the 1926 election.

Initially, it was controlled by a Liberal Party House minority under Prime Minister William Lyon Mackenzie King and the 12th Canadian Ministry. The Liberal caucus did not have a majority of seats in the House - it only had the second most seats - and was propped up by the Progressive Party of Canada MPs.  The Official Opposition was the Conservative Party, led by Arthur Meighen. When the Liberal government fell, Meighen's Conservatives were allowed to form government (the 13th Canadian Ministry), triggering the "King-Byng Affair". Quickly the 13th Ministry fell as well.

The Speaker was Rodolphe Lemieux.  See also List of Canadian electoral districts 1924-1933 for a list of the ridings in this parliament.

The unusual case of a new party taking control of the government between elections has only happened twice in Canadian history; the other occasion was in the 2nd Canadian parliament.

There was only one session of the 15th Parliament:

List of members

Following is a full list of members of the fifteenth Parliament listed first by province, then by electoral district.

Electoral districts denoted by an asterisk (*) indicates that district was represented by two members.

Alberta

British Columbia

Manitoba

New Brunswick

Nova Scotia

Ontario

Prince Edward Island

Quebec

Saskatchewan

Yukon

By-elections

References

Succession

Canadian parliaments
1926 disestablishments in Canada
1926 establishments in Canada
1926 in Canada